The 1995-96 Croatian First Football League was the fifth season of the Croatian top-level league since its establishment. The season started on 13 August 1995 and concluded on 26 May 1996. This was the first season to feature separate A- and B- leagues, with a complicated two-stage format to the season.

After the HNS changed plans during the course of the season, no relegation took place. Instead, 1-A and 1-B were expanded to 16 teams each the following season, with Zadar and Orijent Rijeka joining the teams from the championship group and the Prva A HNL play-off group in the 1-A division for the 1996-97 season.

First stage

Prva A HNL

Rounds 1–22 results

Prva B HNL

Rounds 1–20 results

Second stage

Championship group

Rounds 23–32 results

Prva A HNL play-off

Results

Prva B HNL play-off

Results

Top goalscorers

See also
1995–96 Croatian Football Cup

References and notes
 UEFA Site
 http://rsssf.org/tablesk/kroa96.html

Croatian Football League seasons
Cro
Prva Hnl, 1995-96